Lusitania was a British merchant vessel launched in 1804. She emerges from the general background for two notable events in her history, one in 1813 when the French Navy captured and released her, and then between 1826 and 1830 for a whaling voyage. She was probably wrecked in 1834.

Career
Lusitania first appeared in Lloyd's Register (LR) in 1805.

On 27 August 1807, Captain John Carman received a letter of marque for Lusitania.

Four days earlier, Génie had captured the schooner , which had been carrying dispatches from Jamaica.

Génie also captured Fortune, of Bristol, Hare, master, which had been sailing from St Croix to London. The Frenchmen plundered Lusitania and then put the captured crews on board her. Next the Frenchmen sank Fortune and Haddock and let Lusitania depart. Lusitania arrived at Portsmouth on 25 November.

Capture and release
In 1813 Lusitanias owner was Buckle, and her master changed from Bennett to Johnston.

The other four were:
Blendon Hall, 473 tons (bm), Barr, master, which had been sailing from London to Bermuda;
John O'Gaunt, 426 tons (bm), P. Inglis, master, which had been sailing from London to Martinique;
Aurora, Scheidt, master, which had been sailing to Amelia Island; and,
Superb, 130 tons (bm), R. Roberts, master, which had been sailing from Gibraltar to England.

Due to a heavy storm, the five merchantmen lost contact with the convoy and its escort. On 6 December they were in the Atlantic Ocean when the French frigate Clorinde captured all five. The French took off the crews of four vessels and scuttled three. They kept Lusitania as a cartel and put all their captives aboard her. In their haste, they failed to sink Blenden Hall. They then permitted Lusitania to sail to a British port.

On 18 December  brought Blenden Hall into Plymouth. There, Blenden Hall was reunited with her crew, who had arrived that same day on Lusitania.

Voyages to Australia
The Register of Shipping (RS) for 1823 showed Lusitania with Langdon, master, Buckle, owner, and trade London-New South Wales.  She had departed London 6 July 1821 with general cargo and passengers. She had arrived in the River Derwent, Van Diemen's Land on 28/29 October 1821. Langdon made a second voyage that reached Sydney in May 1823.

In 1825 Lusitania underwent a large repair. Thereafter she is described as a bark.

Whaling
Lusitania left Britain on 21 October 1826 for a whaling voyage to Timor. Her owner was Thomas Sturge & Co., and her master was Robert Ross. She was at St Iago, Cape Verde, on 5 December. She sighted the Australian coast near Shark Bay on 21 April 1827. By 20 May she was at Timor, where she landed five Dutch missionaries. A few days later, on 1 June, Lusitania was at Coupang. Between 21 and 25 November 1828 and 2 February 1829 she was whaling off New Guinea. In November 1828 she was at Saint George's Channel, where she encountered many "old friends" among the locals, suggesting that she had been that way before. On 2 February she spoke Cyrus. Nine days later Lusitania was at Carteret Bay, where she traded with islanders who had come some distance overland to trade a hog for an old whaling lance. Lusitania was again at Coupang on 27 April. By 1829 illness aboard Lusitania was so bad that she had to return home. She returned via Delagoa Bay and the Cape of Good Hope. She returned to Britain on 26 January 1830 with 500 casks and 36 tanks of whale oil.

Coaster
On her return Sturge sold Lusitania and she became a London coaster.

Fate
Lloyd's List did report on 16 September 1834 that Lusitania, Brown, master, had stranded on Fastbro Reef (possibly Falsterborev). She had filled with water and was not expected to be got off.

Lusitania was last listed in Lloyd's Register in 1838, but the listing had been unchanged for several years and showed no owner or trade.

Notes

Citations

References
 
 

1800s ships
Captured ships
Whaling ships
Age of Sail merchant ships
Merchant ships of the United Kingdom